Olybria aliculella is a species of snout moth, and the type species in the genus Olybria. It was described by George Duryea Hulst in 1887 and is known from Arizona, New Mexico and Texas.

References

Moths described in 1887
Phycitinae